Lebanon Trail High School is a public high school located in Frisco, Texas (USA) that is part of the Frisco Independent School District. The school opened its doors in August 2016 for the 2016–2017 academic year. The school is the district's ninth high school. Upon opening, only freshman attended the school, unlike most other high schools in the district. This decision was made by the district in order to not move students from high schools multiple times, as other high schools had recently opened in the area less than 4 years prior. Around 2,000 students attend Lebanon High school it is one of the biggest high schools in Frisco ISD in terms of student population.

Namesake 
The school is named for Lebanon, a community which existed at the site about half a century before Frisco and was located near the Preston Trail. An initial decision to name the school Lebanon High school caused controversy among parents and students alike, who felt that the school's name would be too reminiscent of the Middle Eastern country of the same name; the community was allegedly in favor of a more "American-themed name."

Athletics

The Lebanon Trail Blazers compete in the following sports: 
 Cross Country
 Golf
 Swimming and Diving
 Tennis
 Track and Field
 Wrestling
 Football 
 Softball
 Powerlifting
 Basketball
 Soccer
 Volleyball
 Baseball

Cross Country
The school's cross country teams initially competed as 4A under UIL's classification rules before later moving to 5A. In 2017,as a 4A school, the school sent their first female (also their first runner) to region and state for cross country. During the year 2019, the school transitioned from a 4A school to a 5A school.
In 2021, as a 5A school, the school sent their first male runner to region. The following year, both the boy's and girl's cross-country teams simultaneously qualified for UIL Region at the district meet at Warren Park. Both teams placed second, right behind Liberty High School. This was the first time in school history both teams would be advancing to region for cross country as a team instead of individual runners. That same year, two boys from the school individually qualified for the state cross country meet for the first time.

Band

In the 2019 UIL 5A State Marching Band Preliminary Competition, which was their first opportunity to advance to the State Competitions, the TrailBlazer Band received first overall in the Area Competition and therefore advanced to the State Finals that includes the top twelve bands from the preliminary competition. In the State Finals, the Trail Blazers received 8th overall out of 36 schools.

Theatre 
In the 2021 UIL 5A State One Act Competition, which was Lebanon Trail Theatre's first time attending state they placed Sixth overall for their performance. The following year, for their One Act performance of Cover of Life they advanced all the way to the UIL 5A State One Act Competition, where they placed eighth overall. From Zone to State they won numerous awards for all different aspects of the production.

References

External links
 Lebanon Trail Trailblazer Band
 Lebanon Trail Trailblazer Choir
 Lebanon Trail High School webpage
 Frisco Independent School District
Campus Athletic Coordinator
 Lebanon Trail Blazer Football Teams

High schools in Collin County, Texas
Educational institutions established in 2016
Frisco Independent School District high schools
Frisco, Texas
2016 establishments in Texas